Swordbearer (Polish: miecznik) was a court office in Poland. Responsible for the arsenal of the King and for carrying his sword.

Since the 14th Century an honorable title of the district office, in Kingdom of Poland and after Union of Lublin in Polish–Lithuanian Commonwealth.

 Miecznik koronny – sword-bearer of the Crown
 Miecznik litewski – sword-bearer of Lithuania

Polish titles
Lithuanian titles
Polish–Lithuanian Commonwealth